Call to Arms (also known as Conquest) is a 1982 computer wargame published by Sirius Software.

Gameplay
Call to Arms is a game in which players can fight opponents in Europe during 1942 or in Scotland during 1750 as a strategy wargame.

Reception
Mark Lacine reviewed the game for Computer Gaming World, and stated that "Conquest is a very enjoyable game, simple to learn and challenging enough for the serious computer gamer."

Reviews
Electronic Fun with Computers & Games - Nov, 1983

References

External links
Review in PC World
Review in Personal Computer News

1982 video games
Computer wargames
DOS games
DOS-only games
Sirius Software games
Turn-based strategy video games
Video games developed in the United States
Video games set in Europe
Video games set in Scotland
Video games set in the 18th century
World War II video games